Yogendra Dutt is a Fijian professional football manager. From 2006 to 2009 he worked as manager for Ba F.C. In July 2009 Dutt is a new coach of Fiji national football team. From 2011 he again works as manager for Ba F.C.

Honour
League Championship (for Districts): 5
2006, 2008, 2011, 2012, 2013

 Inter-District Championship : 3
2006, 2007, 2013

Battle of the Giants: 5
2006, 2007, 2008, 2012, 2013

Coach of the Year Award: 2
2006, 2007

References

External links
Profile at Soccerway.com

Year of birth missing (living people)
Living people
Fijian football managers
Fiji national football team managers
Place of birth missing (living people)
People from Ba Province
Fijian people of Indian descent